Nordic combined at the 2015 European Youth Olympic Winter Festival was held at the Montafon Nordic Sportszentrum in Tschagguns and in Gaschurn, Gemeinde Gaschurn-Partenen from 26 to 30 January 2015.

Results

Medal table

Boys events

References 

2015 European Youth Olympic Winter Festival
2015
European Youth Olympic Winter Festival